Kristinn Jónsson (born 4 August 1990) is an Icelandic football player, currently playing for Icelandic club Knattspyrnufélag Reykjavíkur.

Breiðablik
Kristinn came through the youth ranks at Breiðablik, making his first appearance for the senior team in 2007, then at age 17. He won the Icelandic Cup with Breiðablik in 2009 and the national title in 2010. In 2015, Kristinn was voted the Úrvalsdeild player of the season by Icelandic national paper Morgunblaðið.

Brommapojkarna (loan)
On 1 January 2014, Kristinn moved to Swedish Allsvenskan side Brommapojkarna on loan from Breiðablik.

Sarpsborg
On 26 November 2015, Kristinn moved to Norwegian Tippeligaen club Sarpsborg 08.

International career
At the age of 20 Kristinn had represented the Icelandic national team at all levels.

External links
 
 
 
 Kristinn Jónsson short video clip at Vimeo

References

1990 births
Living people
Kristinn Jonsson
Kristinn Jonsson
Kristinn Jonsson
Kristinn Jonsson
Kristinn Jonsson
Kristinn Jonsson
Sarpsborg 08 FF players
Eliteserien players
IF Brommapojkarna players
Allsvenskan players
Kristinn Jonsson
Kristinn Jonsson
Expatriate footballers in Norway
Kristinn Jonsson
Association football fullbacks